Nurzai also spelled as Noorzai (meaning son of the light) is the name of a Pashtun tribe, part of the Panjpai section of Durrani Tareen Pashtuns.

The word "nūr" derives from the Arabic word for the light. While the word "zai" derives from the Pashto word for son or son of. Zai is affixed to the end of Pashtun tribal names.

They are known for their hospitality.

Notable individuals
Hibatullah Akhundzada, Supreme Commander of the Taliban and Islamic Emirate of Afghanistan
Hazrat molvi muhammad janرحمت الله علیه of mirbazar, kandahar . A great sufi of his time and khalifa of hazrat Ghulam Ali Shah Dehlaviرحمت الله علیه

References

Durrani Pashtun tribes
Ethnic groups in Kandahar Province
Iranic people